Rickenbach is a village in the municipality of Schwyz, itself in the canton of Schwyz in Switzerland.

The Rotenfluebahn, a gondola lift, links Rickenbach with the summit of the Rotenfluh mountain, which is, in summer, a popular vantage point over the Lake Lucerne region, and, in winter, a ski area.

References

External links
 

Geography of the canton of Schwyz
Villages in Switzerland
Schwyz